The Convenors' Award for Excellence is one of the  Aurealis Awards presented annually by the Australia-based Chimaera Publications and WASFF to published works in order to "recognise the achievements of Australian science fiction, fantasy, horror writers". The Convenors' Award, awarded at the discretion of the convenors, recognises "a particular achievement in speculative fiction or related areas" that cannot otherwise be judged for the Aurealis Awards, usually because it does not fit into any of the Aurealis categories. Works nominated for the Convenor's Award for Excellence can be non-fiction, artwork, film, television, electronic or multimedia work. The work can be speculative fiction, or a speculative fiction related work "which brings credit or attention to the speculative fiction genres".

Between 2004 and 2012 the award was known as the Peter McNamara Award for Excellence, in honour of the publisher, editor and original convenor of the awards, who died in 2004. It was renamed in 2012 to avoid confusion with the Peter McNamara Achievement Award, presented at the Ditmar Awards ceremony at the Australian National Science Fiction Convention.

To qualify, a work must have been first published by an Australian citizen or permanent resident between 1 January and 31 December of the corresponding year; the presentation ceremony is held the following year.

Winners
In the following table, the years correspond to the year of the work's eligibility; the ceremonies are always held the following year. Each year links to the corresponding "year in literature" article.

References

Aurealis Awards
Australian science fiction awards